
This is a list of bridges documented by the Historic American Engineering Record in the U.S. state of Colorado.

Bridges

See also
List of tunnels documented by the Historic American Engineering Record in Colorado

References

List
List
Colorado
Bridges, HAER
Bridges, HAER